The Brownian motion models for financial markets are based on the work of Robert C. Merton and Paul A. Samuelson, as extensions to the one-period market models of Harold Markowitz and William F. Sharpe, and are concerned with defining the concepts of financial assets and markets, portfolios, gains and wealth in terms of continuous-time stochastic processes.

Under this model, these assets have continuous prices evolving continuously in time and are driven by Brownian motion processes. This model requires an assumption of perfectly divisible assets and a frictionless market (i.e. that no transaction costs occur either for buying or selling). Another assumption is that asset prices have no jumps, that is there are no surprises in the market. This last assumption is removed in jump diffusion models.

Financial market processes
Consider a financial market consisting of  financial assets, where one of these assets, called a bond or money market, is risk free while the remaining  assets, called stocks, are risky.

Definition
A financial market is defined as  that satisfies the following:
 A probability space .
 A time interval .
 A -dimensional Brownian process  where  adapted to the augmented filtration .
 A measurable risk-free money market rate process .
 A measurable mean rate of return process .
 A measurable dividend rate of return process .
 A measurable volatility process , such that .
 A measurable, finite variation, singularly continuous stochastic .

The augmented filtration

Let  be a probability space, and a
 be
D-dimensional Brownian motion stochastic process, with the natural filtration:

If  are the measure 0 (i.e. null under
the augmented filtration:

latter is both left-continuous, in the sense that:

and right-continuous, such that:

while the former is only left-continuous.

Bond

A share of a bond (money market) has price  at time
Because it has finite variation, it can be decomposed into an absolutely continuous part  and a singularly continuous part , by Lebesgue's decomposition theorem. Define:

 and

resulting in the SDE:

which gives:

Thus, it can be easily seen that if  is absolutely continuous (i.e. ), then the price of the bond evolves like the value of a risk-free savings account with instantaneous interest rate , which is random, time-dependent and  measurable.

Stocks
Stock prices are modeled as being similar to that of bonds, except with a randomly fluctuating component (called its volatility). As a premium for the risk originating from these random fluctuations, the mean rate of return of a stock is higher than that of a bond.

Let  be the strictly positive prices per share of the  stocks, which are continuous stochastic processes satisfying:

Here,  gives the volatility of the -th stock, while  is its mean rate of return.

In order for an arbitrage-free pricing scenario,  must be as defined above. The solution to this is:

and the discounted stock prices are:

Note that the contribution due to the discontinuities in the bond price  does not appear in this equation.

Dividend rate

Each stock may have an associated dividend rate process  giving the rate of dividend payment per unit price of the stock at time . Accounting for this in the model, gives the yield process :

Portfolio and gain processes

Definition
Consider a financial market .

A portfolio process  for this market is an  measurable,  valued process such that:

, almost surely,

, almost surely, and

, almost surely.

The gains process for this portfolio is:

We say that the portfolio is self-financed if:

.

Also,  implies borrowing money from the money-market, while  implies taking a short position on the stock.

Motivation

Consider time intervals , and let  be the number of shares of asset , held in a portfolio during time interval at time . To avoid the case of insider trading (i.e. foreknowledge of the future), it is required that  is  measurable.

Therefore, the incremental gains at each trading interval from such a portfolio is:

Here  denotes the dollar amount invested in asset  at time , not the number of shares held.

Income and wealth processes

Definition
Given a financial market , then a cumulative income process  is a semimartingale and represents the income accumulated over time , due to sources other than the investments in the  assets of the financial market.

A wealth process  is then defined as:

and represents the total wealth of an investor at time . The portfolio is said to be -financed if:

The corresponding SDE for the wealth process, through appropriate substitutions, becomes:

.

Viable markets
The standard theory of mathematical finance is restricted to viable financial markets, i.e. those in which there are no opportunities for arbitrage. If such opportunities exists, it implies the possibility of making an arbitrarily large risk-free profit.

Definition
In a financial market , a self-financed portfolio process  is considered to be an arbitrage opportunity if the associated gains process , almost surely and  strictly. A market  in which no such portfolio exists is said to be viable.

Implications
In a viable market , there exists a  adapted process  such that for almost every :

.

This  is called the market price of risk and relates the premium for the -the stock with its volatility .

Conversely, if there exists a D-dimensional process  such that it satisfies the above requirement, and:

,

then the market is viable.

Also, a viable market  can have only one money-market (bond) and hence only one risk-free rate. Therefore, if the -th stock entails no risk (i.e. ) and pays no dividend (i.e.), then its rate of return is equal to the money market rate (i.e. ) and its price tracks that of the bond (i.e. ).

Standard financial market

Definition
A financial market  is said to be standard if:
(i) It is viable.
(ii) The number of stocks  is not greater than the dimension  of the underlying Brownian motion process .
(iii) The market price of risk process  satisfies:
, almost surely.
(iv) The positive process  is a martingale.

Comments
Therefore, the  stocks can be replaced by  equivalent mutual funds.

.

Also, according to Girsanov's theorem,

,

Complete financial markets
A complete financial market is one that allows effective hedging of the risk inherent in any investment strategy.

Definition
Let  be a standard financial market, and  be an -measurable random variable, such that:

.

,

The market  is said to be complete if every such  is financeable, i.e. if there is an -financed portfolio process , such that its associated wealth process  satisfies

, almost surely.

Motivation
If a particular investment strategy calls for a payment  at time , the amount of which is unknown at time , then a conservative strategy would be to set aside an amount  in order to cover the payment.

Corollary
A standard financial market  is complete if and only if , and the  volatility process  is non-singular for almost every , with respect to the Lebesgue measure.

See also
Black–Scholes model
Martingale pricing
Mathematical finance
Monte Carlo method

Notes

References

Financial models
Monte Carlo methods in finance